Kenneth Kirzinger (born November 4, 1959) is a Canadian actor and stuntman best known for his portrayals of Jason Voorhees in Freddy vs. Jason (2003), Pa in Wrong Turn 2: Dead End (2007) and Rusty Nail in Joy Ride 3: Roadkill (2014).

Career

Kirzinger was born on November 4, 1959 in Saskatoon, Saskatchewan, Canada to Agnes and Wilfred Kirzinger. He is of German descent.

Kirzinger's height is listed as 6'4". He started his career as a stunt performer in the early 1980s, appearing in Superman III. He also worked as an actor in TV movies like Brotherly Love and Gunsmoke: Return to Dodge. Although he continued acting, Kirzinger became a prolific stunt performer and coordinator through the 80s and 90s working on films like Shoot to Kill, Look Who's Talking, Bird on a Wire, and It, as well as TV shows like 21 Jump Street and The Commish. 

In 1989, Kirzinger had a small role as a New York cook on Friday the 13th Part VIII: Jason Takes Manhattan who gets in Jason's way while pursuing Rennie Wickham (Jensen Daggett) and Sean Robertson (Scott Reeves). Jason, played by Kane Hodder, threw Kirzinger over the counter. In addition to his role as the cook, Kirzinger served as a stunt coordinator for the film and also doubled for Jason during a few short scenes. This would make him only the second person besides Hodder to play Jason more than once during the course of the franchise.

Role as Jason Voorhees

In 2003, Kirzinger was chosen over Kane Hodder to play Jason Voorhees in the film Freddy vs. Jason. The decision was mostly based on him being slightly taller than Hodder. Although he was disappointed, Hodder and Kirzinger still remain friends. During filming of Freddy vs. Jason, director Ronny Yu tried to limit Kirzinger's stunts on the film as much as possible. Because of this stuntman Glenn Ennis was called in to perform a series of stunts, including a stunt showing Jason walking through a field killing teenagers while on fire.

Appearances
Kirzinger has performed stunts, or worked on the following:

TV shows

Till Dad Do Us Part
Boy Meets Girl
Room Mates
Sirens
Sea Hunt
MacGyver
Bordertown (co-coordinator)
Danger Bay (co-coordinator)
Cadillac
Neon Rider (co-coordinator)
Memories of Murder
Fly by Night (co-coordinator)
Day Glow Warrior
Rescue 911
Max Glick
Shame
The X-Files
Supernatural
Psych (2 acting roles)

Movies

Friday the 13th Part VIII: Jason Takes Manhattan (1989)
Stay Tuned (re-shoots) (1992)
White Fang 2: Myth of the White Wolf (co-coordinator) (1994)
Ace Ventura: When Nature Calls (1995)
Bad Moon (1996)
Futuresport (1998)
Firestorm (1998)
The 13th Warrior (1999)
Cats & Dogs (2001)
Thirteen Ghosts (2001)
Camouflage (2001)
The Santa Clause 2 (2002)
Insomnia (2002)
Freddy vs. Jason (2003)
Hot Rod (2007)
Wrong Turn 2: Dead End (2007)
Stan Helsing (2009)
Joy Ride 3: Roadkill (2014)
The Assignment (2016)

Movies for television with stunt performance credits

Still Not Quite Human
Omen IV: The Awakening
My Son Johnny
Blind Man's Bluff
Brotherly Love
Going for the Gold
Betrayal of Trust
General Alarm
Sirens
The Indestructible Man
Perry Mason
Force III
It
Deadly Intentions... Again?
Barrington
Christmas Comes to Willow Creek
Gunsmoke: Return to Dodge
Return of the Shaggy Dog
Davy Crockett TV pilot
Wiseguy TV pilot
Stranger in My Bed
Glory Days TV pilot
Deadly Intentions
Season of Fear
A Mother's Justice
Jumpin' Joe
I Still Dream of Jeannie	
Diagnosis of Murder
Love Binds

Personal life
His brother, Dave Kirzinger, played for the Calgary Stampeders of the Canadian Football League from 1978 to 1986.
His known friends are Brad Loree, another member of Stunts Canada who notably played horror icon Michael Myers in Halloween: Resurrection, Robert Englund, who co-starred with him in Freddy vs Jason as Freddy Krueger, and Kane Hodder, the actor who played Jason Voorhees before him. Even though Hodder will sometimes state his disappointment at not being chosen to play Jason for the fifth time in Freddy vs. Jason, he and Kirzinger are very good friends and Kirzinger stated they enjoy seeing each other at conventions.

References

External links

1959 births
Living people
Canadian male film actors
Canadian stunt performers
Male actors from Saskatchewan